Fusi (also Fuži in Croatian and Slovene) is a traditional Istrian pasta from Croatia and Slovenia. The pasta dough is rolled out into a thin sheet, cut into strips three to four centimetres wide, and placed over each other. The strips are then cut diagonally, producing diamond shapes. Two ends of each diamond are then folded over each other to meet in the middle and pinched together, making the fuži look like a bow. It is served with a mild red veal sauce, which is usually made out of onions, tomato paste, white wine and broth.

References

Croatian cuisine
Types of pasta
Slovenian cuisine